is a Japanese manga series written and illustrated by Osamu Yamamoto. It was serialized in Shogakukan's seinen manga magazine Big Comic Original from May 2017 to April 2021.

Publication
Akagari: The Red Rat in Hollywood is written and illustrated by Osamu Yamamoto. It was serialized in Shogakukan's seinen manga magazine Big Comic Original from May 20, 2017 to April 5, 2021.<ref></p></ref><ref></p></ref> Shogakukan collected its chapters into ten individual tankōbon volumes, released from November 30, 2017 to June 30, 2021.

Volume list

Reception
Akagari: The Red Rat in Hollywood was one of the Jury Recommended Works at the 23rd Japan Media Arts Festival in 2020.

References

External links
 

Historical anime and manga
Hollywood blacklist
Hollywood, Los Angeles in fiction
Seinen manga
Shogakukan manga
Works about American history